Humphrey Orme (1620 – 2 March 1671) was an English politician who sat in the House of Commons  in 1654 and from 1660 to 1671.

Orme was the son of Humphrey Orme of Peterborough and his wife Mary Orme, daughter of Humphrey Orme of Compton Dundon, Somerset. He was baptised on 12 October 1620. 

Orme's grandfather was a strong Royalist. Nevertheless, Orme supported Parliament, being in 1650 one  Commissioners for raising money in Northamptonshire. In 1654, he was elected Member of Parliament for Peterborough in the First Protectorate Parliament.

In 1660, Orme was re-elected MP for Peterborough in the Convention Parliament.  He was  recommended as a Knight of the Royal Oak. He was re-elected in 1661 for the Cavalier Parliament and sat until his death in 1671.
 
Orme died at the age of  50.

Orme married Mary Apreece, widow of Robert Apreece and daughter of Sir Henry Bedingfield, 1st Baronet of Oxburgh, Norfolk.

References

1620 births
1671 deaths
People from Peterborough
Roundheads
Place of birth missing
English MPs 1654–1655
English MPs 1660
English MPs 1661–1679